The Noah's Ark Principle is a 1984 West German science fiction film written and directed by Roland Emmerich as his thesis at the Hochschule für Fernsehen und Film München (HFF).

While his fellow students typically raised and spent 20,000 Deutsche Mark for their final work, Emmerich managed to collect a budget of 1,200,000 DM (around US$600,000).

This film, shot in color with mono sound, received a rating of 12 in West Germany, and was sold to 20 countries. It was submitted to the 34th Berlin International Film Festival and received some acclaim for technical skill and special effects, but won no prizes.

Plot summary
The year is 1997, and world peace seems to have come, with most classic weapons of mass destruction having been abandoned. However, orbiting the Earth there is the European/American space station FLORIDA ARKLAB, capable of controlling the weather at any location on the planet underneath. A civil project by nature, it might be abused as an offensive weapon, since it could deliver devastation to any potential adversary simply by creating natural disasters such as storms and floods. The space station soon becomes the central point in rising political tensions between the Soviet Union and the United States. The film follows the main protagonist, Billy Hayes, an astronaut aboard the station, as he wades through a plot of secrecy and sabotage trying to tell friend from foe in the process.

Billy enjoys a close relationship with his fellow astronaut Max for the several months they spend together in isolation. Max's wife, Eva, contacts the ARKLAB to announce that she has decided to divorce him because his time away has strained their relationship. A pan to a photograph of Max and Billy smiling as she says this may imply the two have developed a gay romance.

When spies attempt to use the ARKLAB to their own ends, its nuclear reactor becomes damaged. Max attempts to repair it on his own, creating suspicion he is one of the spies. Eva and Vandenberg are sent up to help repair the reactor. Vandenberg turns out to be a spy and sabotages the station. He injures Max. Max kills him, and confesses his love for Eva before succumbing to his wounds. Billy screams Max's name as the station falls apart. He and Eva escape in a shuttle as the station explodes.

Back on Earth, Billy makes a report to his superior, Felix. Felix tells him that the Americans attempted to use the station as a weapon but made a mistake and caused a horrible flood. He sends Billy and Eva on their way. He later learns that both of them died from radiation poisoning and openly grieves their deaths.

Cast

References

External links
 
 

1984 films
1980s science fiction films
Films about astronauts
Films directed by Roland Emmerich
German science fiction films
West German films
Films set in 1997
Films set in the future
1984 directorial debut films
1980s German-language films
1980s German films